Giuseppe Pizzardo (13 July 1877 – 1 August 1970) was an Italian cardinal of the Catholic Church who served as prefect of the Congregation for Seminaries and Universities from 1939 to 1968, and secretary of the Holy Office from 1951 to 1959. Pizzardo was elevated to the cardinalate in 1937.

Biography

Born in Savona, Pizzardo studied at the Pontifical Gregorian University, Pontifical Roman Athenaeum Saint Apollinare, and the Pontifical Ecclesiastical Academy before being ordained a priest on 19 September 1903.

From 1908 to 1909, he did pastoral work in Rome and served in the Vatican Secretariat of State. Pizzardo was raised to the rank of monsignor, and appointed secretary of the nunciature to Bavaria, on 7 June 1909. In the Congregation for Extraordinary Ecclesiastical Affairs, he was appointed: undersecretary (1920), substitute (1921), and secretary (1929). He became an apostolic protonotary on 11 January 1927.

Pope Pius XI appointed him Titular Archbishop of Cyrrhus on 28 March 1930, and on the following 22 April, Titular Archbishop of Nicaea. Pizzardo received his episcopal consecration on 27 April of that same year from Eugenio Cardinal Pacelli, with Archbishop Giuseppe Palica and Francesco Marchetti-Selvaggiani serving as co-consecrators.

He was named president of the Pontifical Commission for Russia on 21 December 1934, and an assistant at the papal throne on 19 January 1936. He was created Cardinal-Priest of Santa Maria in Via Lata by Pius XI in the consistory of 13 December 1937. Pizzardo was prefect of the Congregation for Seminaries and Universities from 14 March 1939 until his resignation on 13 January 1968.

He was named secretary of the Holy Office (the equivalent of what is now called prefect of the Congregation for the Doctrine of the Faith) on 16 February 1951 by Pope Pius XII, for whom he had worked many years in the Secretariat of State. He resigned on 12 October 1959. He was Cardinal-Bishop of Albano from 21 June 1948. He attended the Second Vatican Council.

He was known as an early patron and mentor of Giovanni Battista Montini, the future Pope Paul VI, who is said to have voted for Pizzardo at the 1963 papal conclave. Though they became more distant as Montini rose in power, Pope Paul's final trip away from his summer residence before his death in August 1978 was to a memorial Mass on the anniversary of Pizzardo's death.

Pizzardo was considered to be a highly conservative clergyman. He opposed the French worker-priest movement, and Catholic participation in the Protestant Cold War group, Moral Re-Armament.

Other roles 
He was also involved in Azione Cattolica, serving on its Central Committee as ecclesiastical assistant in 1923 and president in 1938.

Appointed sub-dean of the College of Cardinals on 29 March 1965, Cardinal Pizzardo was one of the cardinal electors in the conclaves of 1939, 1958, and 1963.

References

1877 births
1970 deaths
People from Savona
20th-century Italian cardinals
Cardinal-bishops of Albano
Pontifical Ecclesiastical Academy alumni
Pontifical Gregorian University alumni
Participants in the Second Vatican Council
Members of the Holy Office
Members of the Congregation for Catholic Education
Bishops appointed by Pope Pius XI
Grand Crosses 1st class of the Order of Merit of the Federal Republic of Germany